Mihaela Lazić (born 20 November 2000 in Slavonski Brod, Croatia) is a Croatian female basketball player.

References

External links
Profile at eurobasket.com

2000 births
Living people
Sportspeople from Slavonski Brod
Croatian women's basketball players
Point guards
Croatian Women's Basketball League players